The Dr. Shyama Prasad Mukherjee Thermal Power Station is a 500-megawatt (MW) coal-fired power station at Korba East in Chhattisgarh, India. The power station is owned and operated by Chhattisgarh State Power Generation Company, publicly owned generation utility formed in 2009 following the restructuring of the Chhattisgarh State Electricity Board.

Capacity
The installed capacity of the power plant in 500 MW (2x250 MW).

References

External links
 

Coal-fired power stations in Chhattisgarh
Korba district
2007 establishments in Chhattisgarh
Energy infrastructure completed in 2007